The Three Stooges In Orbit is a 1962 American comedy science fiction film directed by Edward Bernds. It is the fourth feature film to star the Three Stooges after their 1959 resurgence in popularity. By this time, the trio consisted of Moe Howard, Larry Fine, and Joe DeRita (dubbed "Curly Joe"). Released by Columbia Pictures and produced by Normandy Productions, The Three Stooges In Orbit was directed by long-time Stooge director Edward Bernds, whom Moe later cited as the team's finest director.

Plot
The Stooges are TV actors who are trying to sell ideas for their animated television show The Three Stooges Scrapbook. Unfortunately, their producer does not like anything. He gives the boys ten days to come up with a gimmick or their show will be canceled. In the meantime, the Stooges lose their accommodation when they are caught cooking in their room because Curly Joe turned up the TV-disguised refrigerator way too loud which distracted the landlady. The only affordable accommodation that will allow cooking is found in an advertisement in a newspaper. The home belongs to Professor Danforth (Emil Sitka) and it resembles a castle.

Professor Danforth is convinced that Martians will soon invade Earth. He persuades the boys to help him with his new military invention—a land, air and sea vehicle (tank, helicopter, flying submarine). In return, Danforth will create a new "electronic animation" machine for the Stooges to use in their television show. The boys think the Professor a crank but accept his eccentricities along with his accommodation. No one, especially the FBI listens to the Professor's cries for help, but the boys apprehend Danforth's butler who dresses like a monster to terrify the Professor. In reality the butler is a Martian spy made to look like a human.

The Martians, meanwhile, send two more alien spies named Ogg and Zogg who are not disguised as humans to Earth to prepare for the invasion. When Moe accidentally sends a television transmission of old films and scenes of the Twist craze through the Martian's communication device, they are offended and call off the invasion, opting instead to destroy Earth.

Meanwhile, the Stooges give the vehicle a test run. They mistakenly enter a nuclear test area, when their engine malfunctions. They land near a test rig where a test nuclear depth bomb is set up. The Stooges take the bomb, thinking it is a carburetor, and fasten it to the engine. Water, meant to detonate the bomb, shoots out of the testing rig. The military is bewildered by test's failure. With the bomb attached to the engine, the vehicle now performs beyond expectations, even going into space.

Later in the film, the Martians board the vehicle while it's parked and mount a ray gun on it. As they take off with orders to destroy Earth, the boys manage to get onto the craft to try to stop them and prevent the ray gun from destroying Disneyland. The Stooges are able to use one of the Martians' ray guns to separate the fuselage from the conning tower. The fuselage, holding Ogg and Zogg, crashes into the ocean, detonating the nuclear depth bomb. Clinging to the auto-rotating helicopter section, the Stooges survive, crashing through the roof of the television studio in the nick of time and saving their careers.

Cast
Moe Howard as Moe
Larry Fine as Larry
Joe DeRita as Curly-Joe
Emil Sitka as Professor Danforth
Carol Christensen as Carol Danforth
Edson Stroll as Capt. Tom Andrews
George N. Neise as Ogg/Airline Pilot
Rayford Barnes as Zogg/Airline Co-Pilot
Norman Leavitt as William, the Martian Butler
Nestor Paiva as Martian Chairman
Don Lamond as Col. Smithers
Peter Dawson as Gen. Bixby
Peter Brocco as Dr. Appleby
Cheerio Meredith as Tooth Paste Old Maid

Production
The Three Stooges in Orbit was born out of The Three Stooges Scrapbook, an unsold color television pilot produced in 1960 at a cost of $30,000. Producer Norman Maurer reprocessed the Scrapbook footage into black and white and built the plot around the concept of the Stooges rehearsing for their television show. In addition, Maurer was able to use many film props originally used in the film Forbidden Planet.

See also
 List of American films of 1962
Landwasserschlepper

References

External links 
 
 

1962 films
1960s science fiction comedy films
American science fiction adventure films
American black-and-white films
American science fiction comedy films
American space adventure films
Columbia Pictures films
1960s English-language films
Fictional-language films
Films about extraterrestrial life
Films directed by Edward Bernds
Films set in Los Angeles
The Three Stooges films
Films scored by Paul Dunlap
1962 comedy films
1960s American films